Thunderbird 6 is a 1968 British science fiction puppet film based on Thunderbirds, a Supermarionation television series created by Gerry and Sylvia Anderson and filmed by their production company Century 21 Productions. Written by the Andersons and directed by David Lane, it is the sequel to Thunderbirds Are Go (1966).

The film is largely set on Skyship One – a futuristic airship designed by Brains, the inventor of International Rescue's Thunderbird machines. The plot sees Alan Tracy, Tin-Tin Kyrano, Lady Penelope and Parker representing International Rescue as guests of honour on Skyship Ones round-the-world maiden flight, unaware that master criminal The Hood is once again plotting to acquire the organisation's technological secrets. The Hood's agents murder the airship's crew and assume their identities to lure International Rescue into a trap. Meanwhile, Brains' efforts to design a proposed sixth Thunderbird collide with fate when Skyship One is damaged and its occupants' only salvation seems to be Alan's old Tiger Moth biplane.

Actors John Carson and Geoffrey Keen provided guest voices, with additions to the regular voice cast in the form of Keith Alexander and Gary Files. The puppet design compromised between the caricatures that Century 21 had used up until Thunderbirds Are Go and the realistically proportioned marionettes that were introduced in Captain Scarlet and the Mysterons. The film was shot between May and December 1967. Some of the sequences showing the Tiger Moth in flight were shot on location using a full-sized plane, but a legal dispute with the Ministry of Transport over alleged dangerous flying forced the crew to film the remaining shots in-studio with scale models.

Thunderbird 6 was released in July 1968 to a mediocre box office response that ruled out the production of further sequels. Critical response has remained mixed: while the special effects have been praised, the story polarised commentators.

Plot
In 2068, the New World Aircraft Corporation in England gives Brains an open brief to design a revolutionary aircraft. Brains suggests an airship, prompting howls of laughter from the executives. Nevertheless, his proposal is accepted and the corporation builds Skyship One, a fully automated airship powered by an anti-gravity field. Representing International Rescue for the maiden flight – a private round-the-world trip with pre-programmed stops – are Alan Tracy, Tin-Tin, Lady Penelope and Parker. Brains, meanwhile, is forced to remain on Tracy Island after Jeff asks him to design a sixth Thunderbird craft. Working without a specification, Brains produces a range of concepts but all are rejected by Jeff.

Alan and Tin-Tin fly to England in an old Tiger Moth biplane and join Penelope and Parker before Skyship One departs. However, the group are unaware that Captain Foster and the stewards have been murdered and replaced by agents of The Hood, now operating as "Black Phantom" from an abandoned airfield near Casablanca. As the ship is automated, the impostors are not required to demonstrate any detailed knowledge of its systems and are thus able to avoid raising their guests' suspicions as the trip progresses.

After Skyship One leaves the Egyptian pyramids, Penelope finds a bugging device in her bedroom. Unknown to her, Foster and his men have been recording and editing her voice to assemble a fake radio message asking Jeff to send Thunderbirds 1 and 2 to the abandoned airfield, where The Hood and his men intend to hi-jack the craft. During a stop in the Swiss Alps, Parker discovers the editing equipment, but before the group can act the message is completed and transmitted to Tracy Island via John on  Thunderbird 5. Jeff immediately dispatches Scott and Virgil in Thunderbirds 1 and 2, but Alan realises that his brothers are flying into a trap and Penelope is able to forward the warning just in time. On landing at the airfield, Scott and Virgil use the Thunderbirds rocket launchers to destroy The Hood's base. They then take off to rendezvous with Skyship One.

Aboard the airship, Alan, Penelope and Parker engage in a shootout with the impostors but are forced to surrender when Tin-Tin is taken hostage. The anti-gravity system is damaged in the fighting, causing the ship to lose altitude and crash into a radio mast at a missile base near Dover. With Skyship One balanced precariously on top of the mast and its anti-gravity field weakening, it is up to Scott, Virgil and Brains to rescue all aboard before the ship collapses onto the base below. However, Scott and Virgil are unable close in without their thrusters tipping it over and none of Thunderbird 2s Pod Vehicles is light enough to deploy onto it. At Gordon's suggestion, Brains flies the Tiger Moth up to Skyship Ones top deck to airlift the passengers and crew to safety one by one. However, on landing, he is held at gunpoint by Foster and his two surviving henchmen. With Penelope hostage in the plane's cockpit, Foster tries to take off but is shot dead by Alan. The Tiger Moth launches with the International Rescue agents and impostors clinging on to the wings and landing gear. Shortly after, Skyship One crashes to the ground, starting a chain reaction that obliterates the missile base.

The remaining impostors are killed in a shootout aboard the Tiger Moth. Stray bullets puncture the fuel tank, forcing Penelope to make an emergency landing. After near misses with a factory chimney, a bridge on the M104 motorway and a tree, Penelope ditches the plane into a field. Parker is thrown out when the plane clips the tree top and ends up dangling upside down in its branches before falling to the ground.

Back on Tracy Island, Brains unveils the new Thunderbird 6 as none other than the repaired Tiger Moth, which all agree has proven its worth in the field.

Production

Despite the critical and commercial failure of Thunderbirds Are Go, distributors United Artists ordered a sequel. Filmed on a budget of £300,000 (approximately £ million in ), Thunderbird 6s principal production credits were unchanged from the first film, with Gerry and Sylvia Anderson returning as writers and producers and David Lane reprising his role of director.

The Andersons wrote the script in three months, originally intending the film to be about a "Russo-American space project". The focus was changed to an ill-fated airship when the Andersons' colleague Desmond Saunders suggested they base the film on the destruction of the R101. In preparation, Gerry read books on the R101 and other airships, including the R100 and the Graf Zeppelin. The plot was intended to be more light-hearted than that of the first film, which focused on the Mars-bound spacecraft Zero-X. Presenting a de Havilland Tiger Moth as the eponymous Thunderbird 6, the script alluded to advertising for Esso: during the Skyship One rescue, a line of dialogue from Virgil Tracy playfully adapts the oil company's slogan "Put a Tiger in Your Tank" to refer to the "Tiger" in Thunderbird 2s pod. However, the model of the plane is never named in full.

Principal photography began on 1 May 1967 and was completed in four months.

Voice cast

The film's dialogue was recorded in six days at the Anvil Films Recording Studio in Denham, Buckinghamshire. With the exceptions of John Tracy and Black Phantom/The Hood, all returning characters were voiced by the actors who had voiced them on Thunderbirds Are Go. New voice actors for Thunderbird 6 were:
 Keith Alexander as John Tracy and the Narrator. Ray Barrett, the original voice of John, had returned to his native Australia after the production of Thunderbirds Are Go. His replacement, Alexander, was also contracted to provide a brief opening narration explaining the secrecy of International Rescue. Alexander later voiced Sam Loover in Joe 90 and Agent Blake in The Secret Service before starring as Lieutenant Keith Ford in UFO.
 Gary Files as Black Phantom. According to Files, his voice roles in Thunderbird 6 were a trial run for Captain Scarlet and the Mysterons, to which he supplied numerous guest character voices. More roles followed, including the regular voice of Matthew Harding in The Secret Service.
 John Carson as the impostor Captain Foster (codenamed "White Ghost"). Carson's guest appearances in the TV series The Troubleshooters brought him to the attention of the Andersons. His delivery of Foster's dialogue led to a mistaken assumption that the character was voiced by James Mason.
 Geoffrey Keen as James Glenn, the president of the New World Aircraft Corporation. Keen was known to the Andersons for playing the leading role of Brian Stead in The Troubleshooters.

Simon Archer and Marcus Hearn suggest that Thunderbird 6 develops the character of Lady Penelope, thanks in part to a more mature reading of her lines by Sylvia Anderson. They also praise David Graham's contributions, especially his performance as Parker, but note that some of the regular characters from the TV series, including John and Gordon, play only minor roles in the film.

Design

By the time Thunderbird 6 entered production, Century 21's next puppet series, Captain Scarlet, had already started filming. This series introduced a new puppet design that discontinued the caricatured look of the Thunderbirds marionettes in favour of realistic body proportions. The puppets of Thunderbird 6 were modelled as a compromise between the old and new designs: the heads and hands remained disproportionately large but the overall caricature was toned down. Most of the guest character puppets were recycled from Thunderbirds Are Go, although the Captain Foster puppet was a new creation. Puppeteer Wanda Webb remembered that Thunderbird 6 maintained high standards of puppet workmanship, commenting on a scene that shows Penelope asleep: "I had placed the sleeping eyelids in Plasticine and made the eye shadow a little too blue. We ended up re-shooting the whole sequence."

A number of one-off puppets with gaping mouths (showing filled-in teeth) were made for the opening sequence in which Brains' proposal to design a mere airship sends the incredulous NWAC executives into howling fits of laughter. Stephen La Rivière describes this as "a contender for the most horrific scene ever produced by Century 21". The decision to place the title sequence after a cold open was one of several measures taken to distinguish Thunderbird 6 from the previous film.

The Skyship One filming model was built by effects director Derek Meddings, who also oversaw the construction of scale replicas of the various locations seen in the film, such as the Great Sphinx of Giza and the Grand Canyon. The Swiss Alps scenes called for FAB 1 to skate across the ice with miniatures of Alan and Tin-Tin following on skis.

Bob Bell's art department designed each of the rooms on board Skyship One in a unique style; for example, the Ball Room contained spherical decor while the Games Room had a die and chessboards theme. Penelope's quarters, designed by Keith Wilson, were made pink to match the colour of FAB 1. Archer and Hearn describe them as resembling a "Barbara Cartland nightmare". During filming, the heat of the studio lights caused the floor of the Bottle Room set to catch fire, forcing the crew to rebuild it from scratch. The scene set inside the fictional Whistle Stop Inn – a railway-themed Swiss pub where customers are served meals on model trains – required careful planning and coordination.

Aerial stunts

Some of the sequences involving the Tiger Moth, such as Alan and Tin-Tin leaving Tracy Island and Brains landing on Skyship One, were filmed with scale models. For other scenes, the production organised a live-action location shoot using a full-size Tiger Moth. Joan Hughes, a ferry pilot who had flown Supermarine Spitfires and Avro Lancasters during the Second World War, was hired to fly the plane and serve as Lady Penelope's human stunt double. The other characters were represented by dummies tied to the wings and undercarriage. Scenes featuring live-action shooting include Brains' take-off, Penelope's struggle to control the plane, the gun battle with Foster's henchmen, the near misses with the motorway bridge and the chimney, and the crash-landing in the field.

The location shoot was based at Wycombe Air Park in Booker, Buckinghamshire. By the end of summer, the grass around the park had turned brown, so the effects team corrected the colour by applying green paint. Some time later, the production was informed that a local farmer's prize ram had died and that when the animal had been cut open a large amount of green paint had been found inside. Concluding that no one else could have been responsible for the death, the production apologised and compensated the farmer, and production manager Norman Foster gave the farmer's wife a bunch of flowers.

The fictional M104 motorway was represented by the then-unfinished M40. The Tiger Moth's near-miss with the bridge was filmed between Junctions 4 and 5 at Lane End on the High Wycombe Bypass. Before this sequence was filmed, the Ministry of Transport and local police had told the crew that for the stunt to be performed legally the plane's wheels had to remain in contact with the ground while it passed under the bridge. During one of the takes, a crosswind sprang up and the drag from the dummies caused Hughes to fear that she would lose control if the plane connected with the motorway. During another take, the continuing crosswind necessitated another glide, angering the Ministry of Transport official who was supervising the shoot and leading to the arrests of Hughes and Foster.

Hughes was charged with seven counts of dangerous flying and Foster with three of aiding and abetting. However, their trial at Aylesbury Crown Court did not take place until March 1968, by which time production had ended. After a two-day hearing, during which the jury viewed the finished film, the defendants were found not guilty. Commenting on his acquittal, which was reported in the Daily Express with the headline "Under The Bridge Goes Lady Penelope", Foster said that the incident had "opened the way for much greater realism in filmmaking." Hughes remarked that the stunt marked the first time in her career that she had been afraid.

In the time it took for Hughes and Foster's case to reach court, the Ministry of Transport withdrew its permission for any more stunts to be filmed on the M40. The remaining Tiger Moth sequences were therefore filmed with a series of radio-controlled planes on a -scale replica of a section of the motorway. The M40 model was erected outdoors to reduce lighting discrepancies, with the bridge erected against a backdrop of real trees and fields to simulate the intended setting as accurately as possible. The outdoor filming took six weeks to complete due to poor weather.

Built at Hatfield Aerodrome in 1940, the DH82A Tiger Moth that appears in the film (registration G-ANFM, serial number 83604) served in the RAF before being sold to the Association of British Aero Clubs in 1953. After Thunderbird 6, the plane appeared in other films including Agatha (1978). Damaged in a crash in 1992, the repaired Tiger Moth is now a part of the Diamond Nine aerobatics squadron based at White Waltham Airfield in Berkshire.

Music
The score was recorded between 1 and 5 February 1968 at Olympic Studios at Barnes, London with a 56-member orchestra. The opening credits music, which Archer and Hearn describe as "jaunty", plays over shots of Skyship One as it sits on the tarmac at NWAC headquarters. The aerial shots of Alan and Tin-Tin's flight to England aboard the Tiger Moth are accompanied by a rendition of the 19th-century song "The Daring Young Man on the Flying Trapeze". For this sequence, Lane wanted the plane's movements to suggest a "dance" in mid-air, and during the location shoot played the song on loudspeakers to inspire the stunt pilot.

Composer Barry Gray preferred his score for Thunderbird 6 to that of Thunderbirds Are Go as the second film's premise of a circumnavigation gave him scope to devise a variety of themes. The soundtrack was commercially released as a limited-edition CD in 2005.

Release and reception
Completed in December 1967 and awarded a U certificate by the British Board of Film Censors on 22 January 1968, Thunderbird 6 did not see a commercial release until six months later, when it premiered at the Odeon Leicester Square in London on 29 July. Commenting on the lengthy gap between certification and release, Chris Bentley suggests that with the failure of the previous film and the cancellation of the TV series, United Artists had lost faith in the Thunderbirds brand and intentionally postponed the sequel. To promote the film, Lady Penelope impersonator Penny Snow toured the country in a life-sized replica of FAB 1.

Critical response

Thunderbird 6 was a box office failure and its poor reception put an end to plans for another sequel. In a contemporary review for the Daily Mail, critic Barry Norman described Thunderbird 6 as a showcase of "technical excellence" but also pointed out its "class-conscious" side, noting that the manservant Parker is the butt of several jokes over the course of the film.

Stephen La Rivière ascribes the film's failure to a loss of public interest in Thunderbirds: by the time the film was released, the TV series had been cancelled and the final episode ("Give or Take a Million") had been broadcast over a year earlier. He praises the film's visuals, writing that the Tiger Moth effects were "some of the best effects work Century 21 would ever create. It is a testament to their skill and ingenuity that, in the motorway sequence, the model shots are indistinguishable from the original." However, he questions the lack of action sequences, suggesting that this was disappointing to younger viewers and makes the film "[feel] like an extended puppet version of holiday magazine programme Wish You Were Here...?" He argues that this "unfamiliar air" to the film is compounded by its voice acting, which he believes sounds more mature than before (a development he attributes to the casting of new actors like Gary Files and Keith Alexander).

La Rivière further argues that the use of a vintage biplane as the star vehicle, and Virgil's pun on Esso's slogan "Put a Tiger in Your Tank", would have been appreciated only by an adult audience. The film's younger viewers, on the other hand, "had spent the entire 90 minutes eagerly waiting for the most fantastic piece of hardware to arrive. They got an old plane." Commentator John Marriott also criticises the Tiger Moth, remarking that "the big screen was an unsuitable place for the gentle irony of steam-age technology scoring triumphantly over an array of fantasy machines." Responding to claims that the tone is markedly different from that of Thunderbirds Are Go, Gerry Anderson said that as many months had passed since the last TV episode, Century 21 was "much more aware with ['Thunderbird 6] that it wasn't just a question of making a longer episode, but it was, indeed, to make something special for the cinema."

John Peel is dismissive of the film, comparing it negatively to the "well-made fun" of Thunderbirds Are Go. He calls it "a feeble last fling for a brilliant series" with an over-long and illogical plot, weak jokes and little action. BBC Online gives the film three stars out of five, calling it a "weak and perhaps too padded adventure" whose plot has the "extended feel of a special TV episode" instead of a feature film. Jim Schembri of The Age praises the story and describes the film as having a "snappier pace, with an action climax leaps ahead of anything in the latest Bond epic." Writing for the same newspaper, Philippa Hawker notes an increased level of humour, stating that the film is "more self-consciously light-hearted but it's also more suspenseful." The Film4 website awards three out of five, praising Century 21's decision to introduce more realistically proportioned puppets and comparing Thunderbird 6 favourably to the 2004 live-action adaptation. The review describes the film as "entertaining if antiquated" and a "a slice of kid-friendly cinema made for a far more innocent age."

Home video
Thunderbird 6 was first released on DVD in Regions 2 and 4 by MGM in 2001. Special features included an audio commentary by producer Sylvia Anderson and director David Lane. In 2004, an "International Rescue Edition", released both separately and as a box set with Thunderbirds Are Go, went on sale in Regions 1, 2 and 4 with additional special features including three making of documentaries. In 2014, Twilight Time, through their sub-licensing deal with MGM, released Thunderbird 6 on Blu-ray as a double feature set with Thunderbirds Are Go, limited to 3,000 copies and available only through the Screen Archives Entertainment website. The set was re-released by Kino Lorber in 2017.

See also

 1968 in film
 List of films featuring space stations
 List of films set in the future
 List of puppet films

Explanatory notes

References

Citations

Works cited

External links
 
 
 
 

1968 films
1960s disaster films
1960s science fiction adventure films
Airships in fiction
British sequel films
British spy films
Fictional aircraft
Films about aircraft hijackings
6
Films set in 2068
Films set in the Alps
Films set in Egypt
Films set in India
Films set in Kent
Films set in Morocco
Films set in Switzerland
Films set on aircraft
Films shot in Berkshire
Films shot in Buckinghamshire
Grand Canyon in fiction
Marionette films
United Artists films
1960s English-language films
1960s British films